The following is a list of events relating to television in Ireland from 2017. The Late Late Toy Show was the most-watched programme on Irish television in 2017, with an average audience of 1.3 million viewers.

Events
8 January – Dancing with the Stars makes its debut on RTÉ One.
9 January – TV3 Group reveals a new on-air presentation, featuring the number 3 superimposed on various natural and urban landscapes across Ireland. A new logo is also revealed along with new promos and on-screen graphics. Similarly, new identities are introduced to 3e and its rebrand of UTV Ireland to be3.
12 January – Viewing figures indicate that The Late Late Toy Show was the most watched programme of 2016 in Ireland with a total of 1,571,600 viewers.
2 February – The Irish Post acquires Irish TV, saving the channel from closure.
8 March – Irish TV goes off the air. Its Sky slot is subsequently bought by Viacom International Media Networks Europe to launch Spike +1.
26 March – Aidan O'Mahony and dance partner Valeria Milova win the first series of Dancing with the Stars.
6 July – RTÉ One extends its on-air hours, the channel now starting at 6:00am rather than the later 6:20 am.
27 July – Vincent Browne presents his last edition of Tonight with Vincent Browne, with Taoiseach Leo Varadkar as a guest.
8 October – An Irish version of Blind Date, hosted by comedian Al Porter, is debuted on TV3.

Debuts

RTÉ
1 January – Striking Out on RTÉ One
5 January – The Tommy Tiernan Show on RTÉ One
8 January – Dancing with the Stars on RTÉ One
14 May – Kat & Alfie: Redwater on RTÉ One
19 September –  Mr. Mercedes on RTÉ One
24 September – Acceptable Risk on RTÉ One
2 October –  Pablo on RTÉ Jr.
9 November – Ireland's greatest sporting moment on RTÉ Two

TV3
20 September – The Tonight Show (2017–present)

Changes of network affiliation

Ongoing television programmes

1960s
 RTÉ News: Nine O'Clock (1961–present)
 RTÉ News: Six One (1962–present)
 The Late Late Show (1962–present)

1970s
 The Late Late Toy Show (1975–present)
 The Sunday Game (1979–present)

1980s
 Fair City (1989–present)
 RTÉ News: One O'Clock (1989–present)

1990s
 Would You Believe (1990s–present)
 Winning Streak (1990–present)
 Prime Time (1992–present)
 Nuacht RTÉ (1995–present)
 Nuacht TG4 (1996–present)
 Ros na Rún (1996–present)
 TV3 News (1998–present)
 Ireland AM (1999–present)
 Telly Bingo (1999–present)

2000s
 Nationwide (2000–present)
 TV3 News at 5.30 (2001–present) – now known as the 5.30
 Against the Head (2003–present)
 news2day (2003–present)
 Other Voices (2003–present)
 Saturday Night with Miriam (2005–present)
 The Week in Politics (2006–present)
 Xposé (2007–2019)
 At Your Service (2008–present)
 Championship Live (2008–present) – Now rebranded as GAA on 3
 Operation Transformation (2008–present)
 3e News (2009–present)
 Dragons' Den (2009–present)
 Two Tube (2009–present)

2010s
 Jack Taylor (2010–present)
 Mrs. Brown's Boys (2011–present)
 The GAA Show (2011–present)
 MasterChef Ireland (2011–present)
 Irish Pictorial Weekly (2012–present)
 Today (2012–present)
 The Works (2012–present)
 Deception (2013–present)
 Celebrity MasterChef Ireland (2013–present)
 Second Captains Live (2013–present)
 Claire Byrne Live (2015–present)
 The Restaurant (2015–present)
 Red Rock (2015–present)
 TV3 News at 8 (2015–present)
  Ploughing Live (2015–present)

Ending this year
6 January – Ireland Live (2015–2017)
27 July – Tonight with Vincent Browne'' (2007–2017)

Deaths

See also
2017 in Ireland

References